That Man: Peter Berlin is a 2005 documentary about the popular gay icon Peter Berlin directed by Jim Tushinski. The documentary had its world premiere at the 2005 Berlin International Film Festival (Panorama Section).

In the documentary, Berlin narrates his own life in various candid interviews. Many other artists (porn stars, photographers, writers, contemporaries) comment on his legacy in gay culture.

Appearing
All appearing as themselves:
Peter Berlin
Robert Boulanger (actor)
Rick Castro (photographer)
Lawrence Helman (producer)
John F. Karr (writer)
Armistead Maupin (writer)
Daniel Nicoletta (photographer and photo journalist)
Wakefield Poole (porn film director)
Robert W. Richards (writer)
John Waters (filmmaker)
Jack Wrangler (porn film actor)

Reception
The New York Times said, "Vivid reminiscences from John Waters, Armistead Maupin, the pornographic auteur Wakefield Poole and the artist Robert Richards elevate "That Man: Peter Berlin" into a minor classic of demimonde hagiography."

Awards
In 2005, the film won the "Audience Award" for Documentaries at the Milan International Lesbian and Gay Film Festival and the Austin Gay and Lesbian International Film Festival. It won the Jury Award for Best Documentary at the 2005 Reykjavík Lesbian and Gay Film Festival. the 2005 Honolulu Rainbow Film Festival, the 2005 Reel Identities Film Festival - New Orleans, and the 2005 Fire Island Film and Video Festival. All awarded to film director Jim Tushinski.

Release
 Released on DVD in North America by Water Bearer Films (2006)
 Released theatrically and on DVD in German-speaking Europe by Pro-Fun Media (2006).
 Released on DVD in the UK and Ireland by TLA Releasing UK (2006).
 Released theatrically in New York City (Cinema Village), San Francisco (Castro Theatre), and Palm Desert, California (Cinema Palme d'Or) in January - March 2006.

References

External links
That Man: Peter Berlin Documentary Official website
That Man: Peter Berlin Original Motion Picture Soundtrack

2005 documentary films
Documentary films about gay male pornography
American LGBT-related films
Documentary films about American pornography
2005 films
2005 LGBT-related films
2000s English-language films
2000s American films